The 168th Battalion, CEF was a unit in the Canadian Expeditionary Force during the First World War. Based in Woodstock, Ontario, the unit began recruiting during the winter of 1915/16 in Oxford County, Ontario.  After sailing to England in November 1916, the battalion was absorbed into the 4th and 6th Reserve Battalions on January 4, 1917.  The 168th Battalion, CEF had one Officer Commanding: Lieut-Col. W. K. McMullen.

References
Meek, John F. Over the Top! The Canadian Infantry in the First World War. Orangeville, Ont.: The Author, 1971.

External links
Souvenir booklet with nominal roll

Battalions of the Canadian Expeditionary Force
Woodstock, Ontario